Stephenville (Canada 2021 Census population 6540) is a town in Newfoundland and Labrador, Canada, on the west coast of the island of Newfoundland.

The town functions as a local service centre for the southwestern part of the island, serving a direct population of 35,000 people from surrounding areas and over 100,000 people along the entire southwestern coast of the island.

The primary employer in the town was a paper mill, which closed in 2005.

Stephenville has a modern 40-bed hospital (built in 2003), schools, stores, movie theater, banks, and an International Airport (Stephenville International Airport, CYJT), year round ice free sea port (Port Harmon), and government institutions.  The provincial community college system, College of the North Atlantic, is headquartered in Stephenville and maintains a campus there for students from the southwestern region of the island. The Newfoundland and Labrador Public Library system is also headquartered in Stephenville.   A provincial minimum/medium security facility was established in 1978 and provides core programs for federal and provincial offenders.

History

The Stephenville area was formerly known as the Acadian village, between 1848 and 1870. The populace of the village consisted of Roman Catholics who eked out a living, farming and fishing. The town's population continued to grow because of the stable economy. It was also formerly home to Ernest Harmon AFB, which was operated by the United States Army Air Forces and later the United States Air Force from 1941 to 1966.

The base precipitated an economic boom of sorts on Newfoundland's southwest coast during the 1940s. Corner Brook to the northeast had been considered the major population center for the region, given its industrial base and nearby recreational opportunities in the Humber River.  With the massive investment of the Government of the United States in the base, the Stephenville and St. George's Bay area began to flourish.  The village of Stephenville grew from a hamlet of several hundred people with no paved streets, sidewalks, water or sewage system in 1941 into a modern town of over 5,000 by the mid-1950s. By the time Ernest Harmon AFB closed in 1966, the town had more than doubled in size, partly as a result of the provincial government's forced resettlement policy toward residents of outports.

After the base was closed, the facility was turned over to the federal government which then provided it to the provincial government to diversify the local community.

The facility included the air field, which has two runways (10,000 ft x 200 ft, 4,000 ft x 150 ft) and numerous buildings which are operated as the Stephenville International Airport.  An abandoned USAF Pinetree Line radar site is located on nearby Table Mountain, north of the town.  The town uses many former USAF structures for housing, recreation and entertainment.

In 2005, Abitibi closed the town's pulp and paper mill. At the time of closure the mill had approximately 300 full-time and part-time employees.

Transportation 

The Stephenville International Airport, formerly Ernest Harmon AFB, serves a small portion of the west coast of the island; weekly summer air service is offered to Toronto Pearson with Sunwing Airlines, twice weekly international flights are offered to Saint-Pierre et Miquelon, France, in February, June and August with Air Saint Pierre, weekly flights to Halifax, with Porter Airlines operating  from April to January connecting to its network in Canada and the U.S.

Daily intraprovincial bus service connecting to major population centres and ferry terminals across the island is provided by DRL Coachlines.  Dedicated bus service between Stephenville and Corner Brook is provided by Eddy's Bus Services.  Dedicated bus service between Stephenville and Port aux Basques is provided by Gateway Bus Service.

Three taxi companies serve the town: Crown Taxi, Blue Bird Taxi, and United Class Cabs.

The town is located 15 kilometres northwest of the Trans-Canada Highway, and is accessible using Provincial Highway Routes 490 and 460.

Rail service to the town, as well as all of Newfoundland, was discontinued by Terra Transport in 1988.

The density of the town core, and its flat topography, permit residents to enjoy outdoor activities such as walking, bicycling, roller blading, and cross-country skiing.

Education

The first educational institution in the Bay St. George area was the Roman Catholic Church. Bishop John T. Mullock established the first church of the Roman Catholic faith at Sandy Point in 1848 when the population of the area was about 2000. Father Belenger was the first priest in the St. Georges Bay area from 1850 to 1868. Father Sears, then priest in the area, established a church in the growing town of Stephenville. In 1884 there were four Catholic schools in the parish, one at Sandy Point, one at the Highlands, one at Port aux Basques and one at Campbell's Creek.

Today, Stephenville is served by 4 schools: Stephenville Primary, Stephenville Elementary and Stephenville Middle Schools, which are feeder schools for Stephenville High School, SHS also takes in students from St. Thomas Aquinas School in Port-au-Port East

Stephenville is also home to the Bay St. George campus of College of the North Atlantic (CNA) which is Newfoundland and Labrador's public college system. The provincial Headquarters for CNA is also located in the D.S.B Fowlow Building of the campus.

Western College is also located in Stephenville. Formerly known as CompuCollege, the Western College is an affiliate of Eastern College.

Geography 

The town is located on the northeast coast of Bay St. George in southwestern Newfoundland, and on the Atlantic Ocean. It is situated on a small plateau and surrounded by the Long Range Mountains and Lewis Hills on either side. The downtown area lies to the north of the Stephenville International Airport, and the rest of the town expands primarily to the northwest.

The town is bisected by Blanche Brook, a small river which runs roughly north to south before meeting Warm Brook, which flows roughly east to west, before both empty in Bay St. George. The original town of Stephenville is situated on the west side of the brook while the east side consists of the area which was once part of Ernest Harmon Air Force Base. There are 4 bridges which span Blanche Brook: Hansen Highway Bridge, Blanche Brook Bridge (Main Street), Columbus Bridge (Minnesota Drive) and the newest West Street Bridge built after the 2005 flood. 3 smaller bridges span Warm Brook, located at: Mississippi Drive, Carolina Avenue and Connecticut Drive. Another waterway, Gaudon's Brook, forms the western border with Kippens.

The brooks have been used to create a greenbelt/park area that extends through the centre of town, including Blanche Brook Park which was constructed following the destruction of a neighbourhood which formerly occupied the same space.

Climate
Stephenville has a maritime-influenced humid continental climate (Köppen Dfb). While continental patterns dominate with vast seasonal differences and extremely snowy winters, seasonal lag is prevalent as a result of the seawater warming slowly. As a result, summer normals peak in August, with September being warmer than June in spite of the rapidly descending sun strength. Winters are dominated by the high snowfall, but also can see rainy spells during milder weather, which can occur year-round.

Demographics

Arts and entertainment

There are numerous bars and pubs operating in Stephenville. The nightlife caters to a diverse population including students attending both College of the North Atlantic and Western College in town. Live entertainment can be found most nights of the week in at least one location. On weekends, DJs are in house at several nightclubs which have also played host to upcoming DJs and performers from cities such as Montreal and Toronto, while other locations host well-known local performers.

The Bay St. George Folk Arts Council hosts a monthly "Folk Night" at Emile's Pub in downtown Stephenville. The Council promotes local folk artists who work in both the visual arts and in music.

Each summer, the Stephenville Theatre Festival produces high quality professional productions that have attracted visitors from all over Canada and the United States and has been reviewed by publications such as the New York Times. The festival employs upwards of 70 people and is the premiere tourist attraction for the island's southwest coast. The festival performs at the Stephenville Arts and Culture Centre, the second largest of the six arts centres throughout the province. The centre contains a 450-seat main theatre, a 150-seat secondary theatre and an art exhibition area in a building that was once The Service Club on the Ernest Harmon Air Force Base.

Following in Stephenville's strong theatre history and culture, the 2nd Stage Players provide year-round theatre productions put off by locals. The troupe was started by well-known Newfoundland theatre figure Jerry Doyle, who has also initiated acting workshops for youth and adults alike.

The newly renovated Stephenville Cinema is one of only two movie theatres remaining on the west coast of Newfoundland. In its heyday it played host to the likes of Bob Hope, Mae West and Frank Sinatra. Today it hosts big Hollywood titles.

Sports and recreation

The town has numerous indoor and outdoor recreation opportunities. Various schools have public gymnasiums and there are private recreation and fitness facilities in the town and surrounding areas. Stephenville often hosts atlantic, provincial, and regional championships in sports such as curling, hockey, cross-country skiing, soccer, and more.

The International Appalachian Trail has been extended through the area, providing a continuous recreational hiking trail along the Long Range Mountains.  The abandoned railway corridors of the Newfoundland Railway have also been designated the "T'railway Provincial Park", providing a level wilderness trail for bicycling and walking.

Within the town itself, the Walk-a-Ways Trail System offers takes pedestrians throughout the town, from the Base, to Port Harmon, into the downtown and to the fossil forest at its northern terminus. The trail links all of Stephenville's recreation areas and complexes including Bike lanes, several soccer fields, baseball and softball diamonds and tennis courts.

The town also has an 18-hole links golf course that was expanded from a 9-hole course in 1999. The course was originally built by the United States Air Force. The former Caribou Club on the base was converted into a 4 sheet curling rink in the 1970s and retains its original name: The Caribou Curling Club.

The Stephenville Dome is home to the "Stephenville Jets" minor hockey team and is the main ice rink for the Bay St. George region, boasting an Olympic-size ice surface and seating for approximately 1,200 patrons. The rink plays host to hockey, figure skating, broomball, general skating, home shows, conventions and concerts. Along with the Pepsi Centre in Corner Brook, the Stephenville Dome co-hosted the 1999 Canada Winter Games and housed events such as figure skating and speedskating. Meanwhile, the Regional Aquatic Centre provides residents with a full range of aquatic activities. This modern swimming facility built in 1995 includes a regulation sized pool, kiddie pool, hot tub, and water slide.

In addition to privately owned fitness centres, the YMCA has a facility in Stephenville. The West Coast Training Centre, a facility featuring numerous amenities such as a gymnasium, weight room, steam room, squash courts, multi-purpose rooms, and office/meeting space was slated to be closed by provincial government as a cost-cutting measure in 2013. The town assumed ownership of the facility shortly afterward and reached an operation agreement with the YMCA. The organization operates a renovated, modern facility with space for sports such as basketball, volleyball, martial arts, as well as fitness classes and include workout space.

Notable people
 Bananasaurus Rex - Twitch streamer and speedrunner
 Jason Benoit - country music singer/songwriter
 Jacinta Cormier - musician and actress (Life Classes)
 Jeff Hunt - Owner of the CFL's Ottawa RedBlacks and OHL's Ottawa 67's
 Kevin Major - Noted author of works such as the novels No Man's Land and Eating Between the Lines
 Maxim Mazumdar - Actor, director, playwright, founder of Stephenville Theatre Festival
 Brian Tobin - Former Premier of Newfoundland & Labrador
 Sherry White - actress, writer and filmmaker

Notable events

 On July 27, 2005, Abitibi-Consolidated announced plans to cease newsprint production in Stephenville, resulting in a loss of 280 jobs to the town and surrounding region.
 On September 27, 2005, a torrential downpour caused 180 people to be evacuated, after two rivers that flow through the town overflowed their banks and flooded the town. About 140 millimetres of rain fell.
 On October 29, 2005, CBC Television announced that Stephenville had been chosen as site for the annual Hockey Day in Canada feature of Hockey Night in Canada. The event took place on January 7, 2006.

Sister city
 Castlegar, British Columbia

See also
List of cities and towns in Newfoundland and Labrador
Ernest Harmon Air Force Base
Hansen Memorial Highway
Long Gull Pond
Stephenville High School (Newfoundland and Labrador)
Stephenville International Airport

References

External links
 Town of Stephenville - official website

 
Towns in Newfoundland and Labrador